Vats or VATS may refer to:

People
 Vats (clan), a gotra of Brahmins found in India
 Anil Jha Vats (born 1974), Indian politician
 D.P. Vats, Indian politician
 Madho Sarup Vats (1896–1955), Indian archaeologist and Sanskrit scholar
 Pathik Vats, Indian film maker and writer
 Rajeswar Vats (born 1953), Indian cricketer
 S. C. Vats (born 1945), Indian politician
 Sumit Vats (born 1982), Indian journalist turned actor

Places
 Vats, Rogaland, a village in Vindafjord municipality, Rogaland county, Norway
 Vats (municipality), former municipality centered on the village
 Vats Church, parish church in the village
 Vats-houll, a settlement in the Shetland islands, Scotland

Other uses
 Video-assisted thoracoscopic surgery
 VATS lobectomy
 Vault-Tec Assisted Targeting System, in the Fallout video games

See also
 Vat (disambiguation)
 Wat (disambiguation)
 WATS (disambiguation)